Sieniawski is a Polish surname, it may refer to:

Adam Hieronim Sieniawski (1576–1616), Polish–Lithuanian noble
Adam Hieronim Sieniawski (1623–1650), Polish noble, starost of Lwów since 1648, Field Clerk of the Crown since 1649
Adam Mikołaj Sieniawski (1666–1726), Polish noble (szlachcic), military leader
Hieronim Jarosz Sieniawski (1516–1579), Polish noble
Mikołaj Hieronim Sieniawski (1645–1683), Polish noble (szlachcic), military leader, politician
Mikołaj Sieniawski (1489–1569), notable Polish magnate, military commander and politician
Prokop Sieniawski (1602–1626), Polish noble

See also
Sieniawski family, Polish szlachta family
Majdan Sieniawski, a village in the administrative district of Gmina Adamówka, Przeworsk County, Subcarpathian Voivodeship, in south-eastern Poland

de:Sieniawski